Portrait of Abraham Casteleyn and his Wife, Margaretha van Bancken (1663) is an oil on canvas painting by the Dutch painter Jan de Bray; it is an example of Dutch Golden Age painting and is now in the Rijksmuseum.

This painting by De Bray was acquired in 1939 from the Frans Ernst Blaauw bequest. It had been in the family since 1834 and because of the globe on the left it was assumed to be a double portrait of Joan Blaeu (1596-1673) and his wife Geertruid Vermeulen (died 1676). The next year it was determined the couple was clearly too old at the time to be the youthful newlyweds portrayed in the painting, and it was speculated that they were therefore the son of Blaeu, Willem Blaeu II (1635-1685) and his wife Anna van Loon (1638-1680), though their ages didn't match either. Since the bust of Laurens Janszoon Coster features quite prominently above their portraits and De Bray himself was a Haarlem painter whose brother Dirck made engravings for the Casteleyn printing firm until he left town in 1678, it was finally correctly catalogued upon the discovery of a drawn self-portrait by Casteleyn in the North Holland Archives. The couple Abraham Casteleyn and Margaretha van Bancken owned the house known as "In de Blije Druck" where they printed publications for the city hall and the first Haarlem newspaper on the Grote Markt, Haarlem.

References 

Double portrait of Abraham Casteleyn (?-1681) and Margaretha van Bancken (?-1693) in the RKD

1663 paintings
Paintings by Jan de Bray
Paintings in the collection of the Rijksmuseum
Books in art